The Nogales Steam Laundry Building is a historic building in Nogales, Arizona. It was built by Charles Moody in 1915 for W. J. Neuman, a photographer and property owner, and designed in the Chicago school architectural style. It housed a laundromat until the 1930s. It has been listed on the National Register of Historic Places since August 29, 1985.

References

National Register of Historic Places in Santa Cruz County, Arizona
Chicago school architecture in the United States
Commercial buildings completed in 1915
1915 establishments in Arizona